Fabian Connal Frazer Booysen (born 21 March 1992) is a South African professional rugby union player who last played for the  in the Currie Cup and Rugby Challenge competitions. His regular position is flanker or number eight.

Career

2009–2010 : Craven Week and South Africa Under-18

He was selected to represent them at the premier high school rugby union competition in South Africa, the Under-18 Craven Week in both the 2009 tournament held in East London and the 2010 tournament in Welkom.

2011 : Under-19

He played off the bench in their 32–27 semi-final victory over s, as well as in the final, where they became champions by beating the Blue Bulls U21s 20–19.

2012 : Vodacom Cup and South Africa Under-18

Booysen was then selected in the South Africa Under-20 squad for the 2012 IRB Junior World Championship, which was hosted in South Africa for the first time. He started their first match as the hosts got off to a bad start, losing 19–23 to Ireland in Pool B of the competition. He played off the bench as South Africa recovered to beat Italy 52–3 in their second match and started their 28–15 victory over previously-unbeaten England to finish top of the log and qualify for the semi-finals. He started their semi-final match as they easily dispatched Argentina, winning 35–3, as well as the final, which South Africa won 22–16 against New Zealand to win the competition for the first time and ending New Zealand's four-year reign as champions.

Booysen returned to domestic action for the s and made eight appearances during the 2012 Under-21 Provincial Championship. The Golden Lions finished in fifth spot on the log, failing to qualify for the semi-finals.

2013–2014 : Under-21 and UJ

Booysen started the 2013 season representing university side  in the 2013 Varsity Cup. He made five appearances for the side as they finished third on the log to qualify for the semi-finals, where they suffered a 24–61 defeat to eventual champions .

His performances in the 2013 Varsity Cup didn't go unnoticed and Booysen was named in a South African Universities team that played a one-off match against  in Windhoek. The South African Universities side ran out 50–39 winners.

He started their semi-final match against , which required extra time to separate the teams, with Western Province eventually prevailing 44–41.

He was named in the Golden Lions' Vodacom Cup and Currie Cup squads, but failed to appear in any of their matches.

2015 : Vodacom Cup and Currie Cup

Booysen was named in the Golden Lions' squad for the 2015 Currie Cup Premier Division and was included in the starting line-up for the Golden Lions' Round Two match against the Pumas.

Notes

References

South African rugby union players
Living people
1992 births
People from Theewaterskloof Local Municipality
Rugby union flankers
Rugby union number eights
Golden Lions players
South Africa Under-20 international rugby union players
Rugby union players from the Western Cape